Sejuta Cinta Marshanda is a television drama that aired on RCTI and TV3 in Indonesia. Actors include Marshanda, Baim Wong, Ashraf Sinclair, Ben Kasyafani, Tsania Marwa, Ibnu Jamil, Putri Patricia, Wilda Hamid, Meriam Bellina, Annie Anwar, and Vicky Burky.

Cast
 Marshanda as Marshanda/Caca
 Baim Wong as Delvin
 Ashraf Sinclair as Aben 
 Alice Norin as Merry
 Ben Kasyafani as Ben
 Tsania Marwa as Marshella/Sheila
 Ibnu Jamil as Romy 
 Putri Patricia as Vivi
 Wilda Hamid as Vika 
 Meriam Bellina as Anita
 Vicky Burky as Farah 
 Lulu Kurnia as Asri
 Annie Anwar as Diana 
 Rommy Sulastyo as Ardi 
 Leily Sagita as Neni
 Riza Shahab as Akbar
 Magdalena as Della
 Alex Bintaro as Rudi

Extended cast
 Ariel Tatum as Ariel
 Asmirandah as Asmirandah
 Jonas Rivanno as Jonas
 Dude Harlino as Dude
 Oki Setiana Dewi as Oki
 Nikita Willy as Nikita 
 Mischa Chandrawinata as Mischa 
 Glenn Alinskie as Glenn
 Jessica Mila as Jessica
 Rorencia Natassia as Rorencia
 Eva Anindita as Eva
 Rionaldo Stockhorst as Rio
 Citra Kirana as Citra Kirana
 Umar Lubis as Umar
 Lucky Perdana as Lucky
 Rezky Aditya as Rezky
 Yasmine Wildblood as Yasmine
 Atalarik Syach as Atalarik Syach
 Sultan Djorghi as Sultan Djorghi
 Annisa Trihapsari as Annisa
 Anwar Fuady as Anwar
 Giovanni Tobing as Giovanni Tobing
 Asha Shara as Asha

Characters and relatives

Publishers
 Theme Song: Sejuta Cinta Marshanda
 Singer: Marshanda
 Songwriter: Charly van Houten (ST 12's vocalist)
 Story/script: Rafka Ahmad
 Director: Lono Abdul Hamid 
 Supervision: Maruli Ara 
 Assistant Publisher: Heru Hendriyarto 
 Publisher: Leo Sutanto 
 Company: Sinemart
 TV channel: RCTI, TV3 (Malaysian)

References

Indonesian drama television series
Indonesian television series